Austin Rehkow (born March 17, 1995) is an American football punter who is a free agent. He played college football for the Idaho Vandals football team at the University of Idaho.

Early years
Rehkow was raised in Veradale, Washington and attended Central Valley High School in Spokane Valley, Washington. He also played soccer before switching to American football. In 2012, Rehkow set the record for the longest field goal ever kicked in the state of Washington, measuring 67 yards, just one shy of the national high school record set in 1986 by Dirk Borgognone. Kelly Imhoff made (62 yards) in 1929 and Larry Stovall-Moody (60 yards) in 1996 are the only 3 60 yards or more kicked in the state of Washington.  It was one of three field goals of over 50 yards Rehkow kicked that year.

Professional career
Rehkow went undrafted in the 2017 NFL Draft, with the league's scouting combine profile concluding he lacked the leg strength to be a full-time placekicker but had enough precision as a punter to have a future in the league.

Buffalo Bills
On May 5, 2017, Rehkow signed with the Buffalo Bills, who had released their previous placekickers Jordan Gay and Dan Carpenter at the end of the 2016 season. He was waived on August 20, 2017, having lost the competition to Stephen Hauschka.

New York Giants
On January 1, 2018, Rehkow signed a reserve/future contract with the New York Giants as a punter. He was waived by the Giants on May 7, 2018.

Salt Lake Stallions
In 2018, Rehkow joined the Salt Lake Stallions of the Alliance of American Football as a punter. The league ceased operations in April 2019.

Houston Roughnecks
In October 2019, Rehkow was selected by the Houston Roughnecks in the 2020 XFL Draft's open phase. He had his contract terminated when the league suspended operations on April 10, 2020.

Indianapolis Colts 
On December 23, 2020, Rehkow signed with the Indianapolis Colts' practice squad. On January 10, 2021, Rehkow signed a reserve/futures contract with the Colts. On April 28, 2021, Rehkow was waived by the Colts.

References

1995 births
Living people
American football placekickers
American football punters
Buffalo Bills players
Idaho Vandals football players
Indianapolis Colts players
New York Giants players
People from Spokane Valley, Washington
Players of American football from Spokane, Washington
Salt Lake Stallions players
Houston Roughnecks players